Governor of Taiwan may refer to:

 Governor of Formosa, appointed during the Dutch rule period
 Grand coordinator and provincial governor of Fujian-Taiwan, appointed during the late Qing rule period
 Governor-General of Taiwan, appointed during the Japanese rule period
 Governor of Taiwan Province, appointed during the Republic of China period
 A hypothetical Governor of Taiwan Provincial People's Government claimed by the People's Republic of China